Police Staff College may refer to:
Police Staff College, Bramshill
Police Staff College, Bangladesh